Hyphovatus is a genus of beetles in the family Dytiscidae, containing the following species:

 Hyphovatus dismorphus (Biström, 1984)
 Hyphovatus manfredi Wewalka & Biström, 1994
 Hyphovatus prapatensis Wewalka & Biström, 1994

References

Dytiscidae